Karl Maka (born 29 February 1944) is a Hong Kong film producer, director, actor and presenter.

Early life 
On 29 February 1944, Maka was born as Mak Kar-sheung in Taishan, China. In 1958, at age 14, Maka moved to Hong Kong.

Education 
In 1969, Maka earned a Bachelor of Science degree in Electronics Engineering from Polytechnic Institute of Brooklyn. Maka attended New York Institute of Photography.

Career 
Maka started his career as an engineer at a telephone company.

In 1976, Maka started his career in Hong Kong Films. Maka first appeared as an assassin in The Good, the Bad and the Loser, a 1976 film written and directed by him. In 1978, Maka co-founded Gar Bo, a film production company. In 1980, Maka founded Cinema City. Maka is credited with over 35 films as an actor, over 30 films as a producer, 7 films as a writer and 10 films as a director.

One of Maka's most popular film roles is in the Aces Go Places film series, where he starred alongside Sam Hui.

Filmography

Films

Awards 
 Star. Avenue of Stars. Tsim Sha Tsui waterfront in Hong Kong.

Personal life 
In 1963, Maka and his family emigrated to the United States and lived in New York City, New York. In 1973, Maka returned to Hong Kong.

References

External links
 
 HK cinemagic entry
 Karl Maka at lovehkfilm.com
 Karl Maka at letterboxd.com
 Karl Maka at bfi.org.uk
 Karl Maka at rottentomatoes.com
 Karl Maka at fareastfilms.com
 Karl Maka at filmaffinity.com
 Karl Maka at senscritique.com

 

1944 births
Living people
20th-century Hong Kong male actors
Cantonese people
Chinese male film actors
Hong Kong film producers
Hong Kong film presenters
Hong Kong male comedians
Hong Kong male film actors
Male actors from Guangdong
People from Taishan, Guangdong